Mindscape may refer to:
 Mental world, an ontological category in metaphysics, populated by nonmaterial mental objects, without physical extension
 Mindscape (company), a video game developer
 Mindscape (1976 film), a pinscreen animation short film by Jacques Drouin
 Mindscape (2013 film), an American psychological thriller film by Jorge Dorado